Tyrel Shae Lomax (born 16 March 1996) is an Australian born New Zealand rugby union player who plays for  in the Bunnings NPC and the  in the Super Rugby. His regular playing position is prop. He is the son of former New Zealand (Kiwis) rugby league , John Lomax.

Career
Lomax started his rugby career in Australia and made the Australia national under-20 rugby union team. He signed a two year contract with the Melbourne Rebels. Lomax made his debut for the side against the Blues, coming off the bench in a 58–16 loss for the Rebels.

Lomax moved back to New Zealand after spending time there during his childhood and joined Bunnings NPC side  during the 2017 Mitre 10 Cup, making his debut against  at Forsyth Barr Stadium. The Highlanders announced the signing of the former Melbourne Rebels player in September 2017 committing his future to New Zealand rugby. It was announced in May 2019 that Lomax had signed with the Hurricanes for the 2020 Super Rugby season. He was part of the Tasman Mako side that won the Mitre 10 Cup unbeaten in 2019. He was named in the South Island squad for the North vs South rugby union match in 2020 coming off the bench in a 38-35 win for the South.

Lomax debuted for the Māori All Blacks in November 2017 against Canada and played a total of 6 games for the side between 2017 and 2019. Lomax became All Black number 1180 making his debut against Japan in Tokyo in November 2018, but did not play for the side again until 2020 where he made 5 appearances.

References

External links

1996 births
Living people
Australian rugby union players
Canberra Vikings players
Highlanders (rugby union) players
Hurricanes (rugby union) players
Māori All Blacks players
Melbourne Rebels players
Melbourne Rising players
New Zealand international rugby union players
New Zealand rugby union players
Rugby union players from Canberra
Rugby union props
Tasman rugby union players